The women's 4 × 400 metres relay event  at the 1995 IAAF World Indoor Championships was held on 12 March.

Results

References

Relay
4 × 400 metres relay at the World Athletics Indoor Championships
1995 in women's athletics